is the title of the first single by the Hello! Project unit Buono!. Maimi Yajima and Chisato Okai appear as background characters in the song's Promotional Video.

It was first performed on August 22, 2007 at Odaiba's Palette Town and later on Cute's 'Hōkago no Essence' Fall Concert (September 30, 2007) and the 2007 Morning Musume Cultural Festival, on October 7 and October 8, 2007.

"Honto no Jibun" was released on October 31, 2007, in Japan under the Pony Canon label in two different versions, regular and limited, the latter of which included an additional DVD.

The single V version was released on November 21, 2007. It was used as the first ending theme for the Shugo Chara! anime.

Track listings

CD 
 
 
 "Honto no Jibun" (Instrumental)
 "Kokoro no Tamago" (Instrumental)

DVD

Oricon rank and sales 

Total Sales: 42,035

TV performances 
 2007-10-28: Haromoni@
 2007-11-02: Music Japan

External links 
 Pony Canyon: Buono!/Honto no Jibun page

2007 singles
Shugo Chara!
Buono! songs
Song recordings produced by Tsunku
2007 songs
Pony Canyon singles